Basic Beat Recordings is an independent dance record label from Rotterdam in the Netherlands.

The label was founded by Ron Hofland and his then business partner Ronald Molendijk and started releasing records in the early 1990s. Artists such as DJ Tiësto and Ferry Corsten released a number of early records on labels associated with this company before finding international fame, whilst Hugo Zentveld and Aldwin Oomen of Nightbreed and Angel City, have released a number of records by their production projects on sublabels such as Guardian Angel. The label operated a physical record store in the Netherlands until 2007.

Affiliated labels 
 303F Records
 B-House Records
 Basic Energy
 Buckle Up Records
 Denz Da Denz Recordings
 Guardian Angel
 Manual Music
 Search Records
 Straddle Up Music
 Technique Records
 Trashcan Records

See also 
 List of record labels

References

External links 
 Official site
 Basic Beat Recordings at Discogs

Dutch independent record labels
Electronic dance music record labels